Paula Domínguez Encinas (born 11 August 1997), known as Pauleta, is a Spanish football player who plays for Portuguese club Benfica as a midfielder. Alongside her football career, she studies chemistry at university.

Honours 
Benfica
Campeonato Nacional Feminino: 2020–21
 Campeonato Nacional II Divisão Feminino: 2018–19
 Taça de Portugal: 2018–19
 Taça da Liga: 2019–20, 2020–21
 Supertaça de Portugal: 2019

References 

1997 births
Living people
Spanish women's footballers
Women's association football midfielders
S.C. Braga (women's football) players
S.L. Benfica (women) footballers
Campeonato Nacional de Futebol Feminino players
Expatriate women's footballers in Portugal
Footballers from Redondela
Spanish expatriate women's footballers
Spanish expatriate sportspeople in Portugal